Hincks Conservation Park is a protected area in the Australian state of South Australia on the Eyre Peninsula located about  north of Port Lincoln and  south east of Lock in the gazetted locality of Tooligie.  

The conservation park was proclaimed under the National Parks and Wildlife Act 1972 in 1972 in relation to a parcel of land of which part had enjoyed protected area status since 1941.  The majority of the land forming the conservation park as of 2014 was part of a conservation reserve proclaimed under the Crown Lands Act 1929 in 1993 and which was added to the conservation park in 2004  prior to the majority of the land holding being excised to create the Hincks Wilderness Protection Area.  
 
One source states that the conservation park was named after Sir Cecil Stephen Hincks, SA Minister of Lands, Irrigation and Repatriation (1946–1963) while another states that its name was derived from the former Hincks Conservation Reserve.

It is classified as an IUCN Category VI protected area.

See also
 Protected areas of South Australia

References

External links
Hincks Conservation Park webpage on protected planet

Conservation parks of South Australia
Protected areas established in 1941
1941 establishments in Australia
Eyre Peninsula